The 2015 Lamar Cardinals football team represented Lamar University in the 2015 NCAA Division I FCS football season. The Cardinals were led by sixth-year head coach Ray Woodard and played their home games at Provost Umphrey Stadium. They are a member of the Southland Conference.

The Cardinals finished the season with a 5–6 record overall.  In Southland Conference play, the Cardinals finished in a three-way tie for fifth place with a 4–5 conference record.

TV and radio media
All Lamar games were broadcast on KLVI, also known as News Talk 560.

Live video of all home games (except those broadcast via the American Sports Network or ESPN3) was streamed by Lamar University's Big Red Sports Network .

Previous season
In 2014, the Cardinals finished the season 8–4, 5–3 in Southland play.  The eight win overall and five win conference record matched the Cardinals' best overall win record in both categories as a four-year program.

Team records
In addition to matching season and conference wins, several other team marks were broken.  Caleb Berry broke the team record for passing touchdowns in a season with thirty-three (33).  Mark Roberts broke the record for receptions in a season with forty-six (46) receptions, with thirteen (13) of those for touchdowns.  He also became the first Cardinal to gain over 1,000 yards in receptions.  Additionally, playing for the Cardinals only two seasons, Roberts ended up as the team's career touchdown reception leader with seventy-nine (79).

Honors and recognition
All-American - Mark Roberts was named to the AP All-America Team, 3rd team and was later named to the Sports Network 2014 FCS All-America Team, 3rd team.
SLC All-Conference - Eleven Cardinals received Southland Conference All-Conference recognition at the conclusion of the 2014 season.  Mark Roberts was named to the SLC All-Conference 1st team on offense.  Caleb Berry and Reggie Begelton were named to the SLC All-Conference 2nd team on offense while Omar Tebo and Xavier Bethany were named to the SLC All-Conference 2nd team on defense.  Six Cardinals received honorable mention honors.  Those included Bret Treadway, Tramond Shead, and Chance McCormick on offense.  Joe Okafor, Keith Curran, and Ronnie Jones, Jr. received honorable mention recognition on defense.

Before the season
Contract extension - On December 4, 2014, Lamar University announced that head football coach, Ray Woodard, had received a new three-year contract.  The announcement followed the conclusion of an 8–4 season with a 5–3 conference record.  The season also marked the Cardinals's first victory over a nationally ranked opponent since the return of a program Woodard had been originally hired to resurrect.
Retirement - On February 4, 2015, the Cardinals's offensive coordinator, Larry Kueck, announced his retirement after twenty-nine (29) years in the coaching profession.
Transfers out - Quarterbacks Rex Dausin and Robert Mitchell left the Lamar football program in January.
Transfers in - Three players transferred in to the team before signing day.  Cameron Hampton transferred to the Cardinals from the University of Texas Longhorns.  Quarterback, Joe Minden, transferred to the Cardinals from conference foe, Stephen F. Austin.  Quarterback, Carson Earp, transferred from Navarro College.

Another player transferred in after signing day.  Defensive end, David Owens, transferred to the Cardinals from Hampton University in February.

2015 recruits
Lamar signed 26 players on national letter of intent day. Recruits are listed in the "Class of 2015 Signees" table below. Player profiles for each recruit are available at the signing day link below.  The 2015 recruits included 23 players from high school and 3 transfers.  All three of the transfer players transferred from NCAA Division I (FBS) programs.

Signing Day Link:

Class of 2015 signees

5th Crawfish Bowl
The 5th Annual Red-White Crawfish Bowl was held Saturday, March 7. The team was divided into Red and White teams as in previous years.  A draft of ten rounds was held with each side picking players of the same position.  Offensive linemen were not drafted.  They played for both teams.  The White team got the first pick of the draft since the Red team got first pick of coaches.  The draft was streamed live over Lamar's Big Red Sports Network.

The game was divided into four ten-minute quarters with a 15-minute half time.  Kickoffs, kick returns, and turnovers were live.  Field goals and extra points were not live.  The White team  won 7–3 with all scores in the second quarter.

Roster

Schedule
Lamar University announced its 2015 football schedule on February 24, 2015.  According to the announcement, the 2015 schedule consisted of eleven games with an expanded conference schedule of nine games.  Out of conference games included the season opener against the Bacone College Warriors, a NAIA member from the Red River Athletic Conference, followed by an away game against the NCAA Division I (FBS) Big 12 Conference member, Baylor Bears.  Five of the games, including four Southland Conference games, were played at home at Provost Umphrey Stadium.  There were no consecutive home games in the schedule.

The Houston Baptist/Lamar game was televised on tape delay.

Game summaries

Bacone College

Sources:

@ Baylor

Sources:

@ Sam Houston State

Sources:

@ Southeastern Louisiana

Sources:

Abilene Christian

Sources:

@ Northwestern State

Sources:

Central Arkansas

Sources:

@ Houston Baptist

Sources:

 Game will be televised on tape delay.

Nicholls (Homecoming Game)

Sources:

@ Incarnate Word

Sources:

McNeese State

Sources:

References

Lamar
Lamar Cardinals football seasons
Lamar Cardinals football